Samuel Lattès (21 February 1873 (Nice) – 5 July 1918) was a French mathematician.

From 1892 to 1895 he studied at the École Normale Superieure. After this he was a teacher in Algiers, Dijon and Nice. After a promotion to Paris in 1906 he moved first to Montpellier in 1908 and then to Besançon, before he took up a professorship at the University of Toulouse in 1911. He died of typhus in 1918.

Today Lattès is best known for his work on complex sets, particularly for examples of rational functions including the Julia set and the Riemann sphere. Today these are described as Lattès maps or Lattès examples.

See also
Pierre Fatou
Gaston Julia
Lattès map

Bibliography
 Adolphe Buhl: Éloge des Samuel Lattès. Mémoires de l'Academie des Sciences, Inscriptions et Belles-Lettres de Toulouse, Band 9, 1921, S. 1–13.
 ; English translation:

References

1873 births
1918 deaths
École Normale Supérieure alumni
20th-century French mathematicians
Deaths from typhus
French people in French Algeria